The 2014 Pacific Rugby League International was played between Samoa and Fiji. The fixture was a qualifier for the 2014 Four Nations. Samoa won the test match by 32–16 after being behind 16–12 at half-time. Samoa's Penani Manumalealii won the man of the match award, scoring 3 tries in the match.

Samoa picked 7 debutantes for the test match, while Fiji featured three. All of the Samoan team were National Rugby League based players, while the Fijian side had 10 players from the NRL. Samoa's most capped player was Daniel Vidot who made his 6th appearance for his country, while Fiji's most experienced players were Alipate Noilea, Aaron Groom, and captain Ashton Sims who all made their 10th appearance for their nation.

Match details

Fiji vs Samoa

Aftermath

After the test match, Petero Civoniceva said that "Test matches between emerging nations is a necessity for the game to grow outside of Australia, New Zealand and England".

Due to the win, Samoa had qualified for the 2014 Four Nations. Samoa lost all three matches, losing to England 26–32 at Suncorp Stadium in Brisbane on the tournament's opening day double header, New Zealand 12–14 at Toll Stadium in Whangarei, and then finally to Australia 18–44 at Win Stadium in Wollongong.

ANZAC test

The 2014 Anzac Test was a rugby league test match played between Australia and New Zealand at Allianz Stadium in Sydney on 2 May 2014. It was the 15th Anzac Test played between the two nations since the first was played under the Super League banner in 1997. It was also the first Test match played in Sydney since the 2010 Four Nations tournament. A Women's All Stars Match which is the Women's rugby league version of the game was played as the main curtain raiser for the Test, which was won 24-0 by the Women's All Stars.

References

See also
 2014 Anzac Test

Pacific Rugby League International
Rugby league in Sydney
2014 in Fijian sport
2014 in Samoan sport